Lars Nordberg (born 23 April 1982) is a Norwegian handball player. He has played handball in the highest Norwegian league, and also had a brief football career as a goalkeeper.

Career
He hails from Elverum, where he started out as a handball player. As a teenager he tried out as a football goalkeeper by coincidence, and started playing for Elverum Fotball. He was on trial in Rosenborg BK, but joined Hamarkameratene ahead of the 2002 season. He played one match in the 1. divisjon against Lørenskog and one cup game, but his career was marred by injuries. He was loaned out to Elverum Fotball in 2003, and never returned to Hamarkameratene.

Instead, he returned to handball and joined Elverum Håndball in the highest Norwegian league.

After twelve seasons with Elverum Håndball, Nordberg was not offered a new contract with the club and joined the second-tier team Kolstad Håndball.

References 

1982 births
Living people
People from Elverum
Norwegian male handball players
Norwegian footballers
Hamarkameratene players
Norwegian First Division players
Association football goalkeepers
Sportspeople from Innlandet